The 2022 Asian Men's Club Volleyball Championship  was the 22nd edition of the Asian Men's Club Volleyball Championship, an annual international men’s volleyball club tournament organized by the Asian Volleyball Confederation (AVC) with Islamic Republic of Iran Volleyball Federation (I.R.I.V.F.). 

The tournament was held in Tehran, Iran, from 14 to 20 May 2022. The champions qualified for the 2022 FIVB Volleyball Men's Club World Championship.

Qualification
Following the AVC regulations, The maximum of 16 teams in all AVC events will be selected by
1 team for the host country
10 teams based on the final standing of the previous edition
5 teams from each of 5 zones (with a qualification tournament if needed)

Due to anticipated difficulty for national federations to field teams due to the COVID-19 pandemic, the AVC allowed two clubs from the same national federation to participate in the case that there are less than 8 federations enter the tournament. In the case of less than 16 entrants, Iran as host country is entitled to enter two teams. Their two berths are credited to have been attained as host nation and champions in the 2021 championships.

Qualified associations

 Iran as host country is entitled to enter two teams if there are less than 16 entrants.
 Iraq is entitled to enter two teams if there are less than 8 federations enter the tournament.
 The Uzbekistan Volleyball Federation decided to withdraw their team from the competition. 
 The PNVF decided to withdraw the Dasma Monarchs due to training of the Philippines volleyball team in Qatar for the 2021 Southeast Asian Games.

Squads

Participating teams
The following teams were entered for the tournament.

Venues
The tournament will be host in Azadi Indoor Stadium, located in Tehran, Iran.

Pool standing procedure
 Total number of victories (matches won, matches lost)
 In the event of a tie, the following first tiebreaker will apply: The teams will be ranked by the most point gained per match as follows:
 Match won 3–0 or 3–1: 3 points for the winner, 0 points for the loser
 Match won 3–2: 2 points for the winner, 1 point for the loser
 Match forfeited: 3 points for the winner, 0 points (0–25, 0–25, 0–25) for the loser
 If teams are still tied after examining the number of victories and points gained, then the AVC will examine the results in order to break the tie in the following order:
 Set quotient: if two or more teams are tied on the number of points gained, they will be ranked by the quotient resulting from the division of the number of all set won by the number of all sets lost.
 Points quotient: if the tie persists based on the set quotient, the teams will be ranked by the quotient resulting from the division of all points scored by the total of points lost during all sets.
 If the tie persists based on the point quotient, the tie will be broken based on the team that won the match of the Round Robin Phase between the tied teams. When the tie in point quotient is between three or more teams, these teams ranked taking into consideration only the matches involving the teams in question.

Preliminary round
All times are Iran Daylight Time (UTC+04:30).

Pool A

|}

 
 
 
 

|}

Pool B

|}

 
 
 
 

|}

Final round
All times are Iran Daylight Time (UTC+04:30).

Brackets

Quarterfinals 
|}

5th–8th semifinals 
 
 
|}

Semifinals 
 
 
|}

7th place match
  
|}

5th place match
  
|}

3rd place match
|}

Final
|}

Final standing

Awards

Most Valuable Player
 (Paykan Tehran)
Best Setter
 (Paykan Tehran)
Best Outside Spikers
 (Suntory Sunbirds)
 (Paykan Tehran)

Best Middle Blockers
 (Paykan Tehran)
 (Taraz)
Best Opposite Spiker
 (Suntory Sunbirds)
Best Libero
 (M. Shahdab Yazd)

See also
2022 Asian Women's Club Volleyball Championship

References

Asian Volleyball Club Championship
International volleyball competitions hosted by Iran
2022 in Iranian sport
May 2022 sports events in Asia